Orthochilus mechowii is a species of orchid. It occurs from Nigeria to Western Ethiopia and South Africa. It was previously known as Eulophia mechowii until recently transferred back to the genus Orthochilus.

Synonyms 
The following are heterotypic synonyms :
Orthochilus renschianus  Rchb.f. 
Eulophia zeyheri  Hook.f.
Eulophia mechowii  (Rchb.f.) T.Durand & Schinz
Eulophia milanjiana  Rendle 
Eulophia renschiana  (Rchb.f.) T.Durand & Schinz 
Eulophia praestans  Rendle 
Eulophia woodii  Schltr. 
Eulophia dichroma  Rolfe in D.Oliver & auct. suc. (eds.) 
Eulophia lujae  De Wild. 
Eulophia granducalis  Kraenzl. 
Eulophia amblypetala  Kraenzl.

References

External links
 

Eulophiinae